Luciocephalus is a genus of gouramies native to Southeast Asia. Both are extremely specialized niche predators native to parts of Thailand, Malaysia, Indonesia and Brunei Darussalam; in addition, both species - like a number of other osphronemid genera - are paternal mouthbrooders.

Species
There are currently two recognized species in this genus:
 Luciocephalus aura H. H. Tan & P. K. L. Ng, 2005
 Luciocephalus pulcher (J. E. Gray, 1830) (Pikehead)

References

 
Luciocephalinae
Freshwater fish genera
Taxa named by Pieter Bleeker